Miss Earth United States 2018 was the 14th edition of Miss Earth United States pageant that was held at Rachel M. Schlesinger Concert Hall in Alexandria, Virginia on July 14, 2018 with Brittany Ann Payne and Justin Stewart served as hosts. Andreia Gibau of Massachusetts crowned her successor Yashvi Aware of Maryland (representing Midatlantic) as Miss Earth United States 2018. Aware represented the United States at the Miss Earth 2018 pageant in the Philippines.

Results 

§ - Earned Top 20 placement as winner of Charitable Giving Fundraiser award

Awards

Finalist Awards

Non-Finalist Awards

Other Awards

Order of announcement

Top 20
 Georgia
 New Mexico
 Mississippi
 Hawaii
 Missouri
 Massachusetts
 Florida
 South Carolina
 New York
 Arizona
 Puerto Rico
 District of Columbia
 Texas
 Midatlantic
 Virginia
 Nebraska
 Illinois
 Delaware
 Maryland
 New England

Top 12
 Missouri
 Texas
 Hawaii
 Georgia
 Massachusetts
 Florida
 Midatlantic
 Puerto Rico
 Virginia
 Arizona
 New York
 District of Columbia

Top 5
 Texas
 Midatlantic
 Hawaii
 Puerto Rico
 New York

Pageant 
Pageant activities took place from July 10–14, 2018 in the Washington metropolitan area, which included a service day in Washington, D.C. with delegates from the Teen, Miss, and Elite divisions cleaning up trash within the National Mall.

Additionally, delegates are scored on their social media activity leading up to the national pageant, as well as their environmental project that occurred in June for the organization's Think Local, Act Global initiative.

All phases of the pageant were available via livestream on the Miss Earth United States Facebook page.

Preliminary rounds 
Preliminary rounds took place on July 12 & July 13, 2018 at the Crystal City Marriott in Arlington, Virginia. Delegates competed in a public speaking presentation, and on-stage the following day for runway, swimwear, and evening gown. The runway and swimwear preliminaries were hosted by Brittany Payne, Adele Scala, and Leslie Jackson, with Payne returning to host the evening gown preliminary alongside Andreia Gibau.

Finals 
During the final competition, the top 20 competed in runway, while the top 12 also competed in swimwear and evening gown. The top five delegates also competed in an on-stage question round and were scored on their response to: What do you do to inspire others to be green?

Delegates 
Delegate information provided by the Miss Earth United States organization.

Replacements 

  California – Tayler Troup was awarded Miss Earth California 2018 after it was announced on June 29, 2018 that the original appointed titleholder, Suzanne Perez, would be unable to compete at Miss Earth United States 2018.

Withdrawals 

  California – Tayler Troup
  Michigan – Jasmina Cunmulaj - Decided to withdraw on May 31, 2018 to focus on her studies and advocacy.
  Ohio – Grace Tachikawa
  Rocky Mountains – Lauren MacRitchie
  Utah – Carolina West

Judges

Preliminary judges 

 Siria Bojorquez – Miss Earth United States 2012, Top 8 at Miss Earth 2012 and Miss Teen Earth United States 2010 
 Ismatu Daramy – Miss Earth Sierra Leone 2017
 Ayesha Gilani-Taylor – Miss Earth Pakistan 2009
 Jamie Herrell – Miss Earth 2014 
 Kristin Chucci – Ms. Earth 2017 and Elite Miss Earth 2017 (Public Speaking)
 Elizabeth Peace – Mrs. Maryland International 2018 (Public Speaking)
 Kinosha Soden – Mrs. DC America 2016 (Public Speaking)
 Angel Strong – Junior Miss Earth United States 2017 (Public Speaking)
 Lisa Van Orden – International Ms. 2018 (Public Speaking)
 Elle White - Former Contestant on Match Made in Heaven (Runway)
 Stephen P. Smith - Founder & CEO of Planet Beach & HOTWORX (Swimwear)

Finals judges 

 Siria Bojorquez – Miss Earth United States 2012, Top 8 at Miss Earth 2012 and Miss Teen Earth United States 2010 
 CJ Comu – CEO & Founder Chairman of EarthWater
 Ismatu Daramy – Miss Earth Sierra Leone 2017
 Ayesha Gilani-Taylor – Miss Earth Pakistan 2009
 Jamie Herrell – Miss Earth 2014

References

External links 

 

Miss Earth United States
July 2018 events in the United States
2018 beauty pageants
Miss Earth United States delegates
Beauty pageants in the United States
2018 in Washington, D.C.